Mercy Hospital and Medical Center now called Insight Hospital and Medical Center Chicago is a 414-bed general medical and surgical Catholic teaching hospital in Chicago, Illinois. Established in 1852, the hospital was the first chartered hospital in Chicago. In 1859, Mercy Hospital became the first Catholic hospital to affiliate with a medical school—Lind Medical School—and the first to require a graded curriculum.

History

The Sisters of Mercy came from Ireland to the United States in the 1840s; six came to Chicago in 1846, establishing first a high school and then in 1852 a hospital at Rush Street and the Chicago River. It was the first chartered facility in Chicago. In 1859, Mercy Hospital affiliated with Lind Medical School, and was thus the first Catholic hospital to do so. It had moved to a building at Wabash and Van Buren Streets in the later-named Loop or Central business district of Chicago. Then in 1863, it moved to 26th Street and Calumet Avenue, a location considered rather far south at the time, away from the populace. The hospital was expanded in 1869, with its address on Prairie Avenue, a street just east of Calumet and running parallel to it, which proved timely when the Great Chicago Fire happened in 1871, located outside of the burned area but close enough to help fire victims.

In 1968, after planning a new and modern facility since the 1950s, Mercy Hospital opened in its present location on South Michigan Avenue, just west of its former location. The site extends from 25th to 26th Streets, and from Michigan Avenue east to Martin Luther King Drive. Then-Mayor Richard J. Daley aided the hospital in acquiring the site so that it continued to serve the city of Chicago.

While running for president in 1912, former President Theodore Roosevelt survived an assassination attempt by salon-keeper John Flammang Schrank in Milwaukee. After delivering his speech, he began to show the effects of shock and blood loss and was rushed to Chicago. Subsequently, Roosevelt was treated at Mercy Hospital.

It is the main women's cancer center in Illinois. It accepted patients from Michael Reese Hospital and Medical Center and absorbed the ambulance routes when the hospital closed in 2008.

Mercy was the hospital used by the Richard J. Daley family: all of their seven children were born there. Mercy sold a plot of land to the north of their hospital for 60 million dollars in 2008.

In 2011, Mercy received a $66 million loan from the United States Department of Housing and Urban Development for a new cardiac unit.

In 2020, Mercy filed for chapter 11 protection with $100 million to $500 million in both assets and liabilities due to declining utilization which created excess inpatient bed capacity and increasing competition from local health systems.

2018 shooting

On Monday, November 19, 2018, four people were shot and killed in or near the hospital, including the perpetrator.

Accreditation and patients
Mercy is a Level 2 Trauma Center. The last year data were made available, Mercy Hospital and Medical Center had 16,359 admissions, 2,186 inpatient procedures, 3,973 outpatient surgeries, and its emergency department had 52,692 visits. The hospital is accredited by the American Osteopathic Association's Healthcare Facilities Accreditation Program. In 2012, Mercy Hospital and Medical Center was ranked #35 for all hospitals in the State of Illinois and #27 in the Chicago metropolitan area by U.S. News & World Report.

Complaint for refusal to treat based on religious ethics
In June 2016, a woman filed complaints with the appropriate federal and state agencies against Mercy Hospital and Medical Center, for refusing to treat her although she was bleeding, cramping, and in pain after her IUD dislodged. The woman was unaware that the hospital was Catholic, and the doctor conferred with other doctors on staff as to what treatment was allowed. No treatment was given. The hospital follows policies set out by the United States Conference of Catholic Bishops as to limitations on medical care in conformance with their religious beliefs. Mercy Hospital stated that their protocol in caring for a woman with a dislodged or troublesome IUD would be to remove it, and that the doctor bore the responsibility for her refusal to administer the recommended medical treatment. The hospital pledged to review the training procedures for doctors on their staff.

Purchase by Insight Chicago 

Insight Chicago, a clinical technology company, has been the owner of Mercy Hospital and Medical Center since June 1, 2021. According to Bloomberg, they plan on injecting $50 million to the struggling hospital as part of a "comprehensive plan to increase services and meet community need." They have reported plans of reviving Mercy's status as a teaching hospital. As of June 2, 2021, the facility has been renamed Insight Hospital & Medical Center.

See also 

 John Benjamin Murphy

References

External links
 

 

Catholic hospitals in North America
Hospitals in Chicago
Hospitals established in 1852
1852 establishments in Illinois
Catholic health care